Anthony Frank Tremlett (25 August 1937 – September 2016) was an Anglican archdeacon.

Tremlett was  educated at Plymouth College and had a career on the railways until he was ordained in 1982. He was successively curate, priest in charge and Vicar of Southway.  He became Archdeacon of Totnes in 1988 and Archdeacon of Exeter in 1994.

One of his sons, Andrew, is also a senior Church of England priest.

Tremlett died in Derriford Hospital, Plymouth, in September 2016.

References

1937 births
People educated at Plymouth College
Archdeacons of Totnes
Archdeacons of Exeter
Living people